Djibril Sambou is a Senegalese judoka. He competed in the men's half-lightweight event at the 1980 Summer Olympics.

References

External links
 

Year of birth missing (living people)
Living people
Senegalese male judoka
Olympic judoka of Senegal
Judoka at the 1980 Summer Olympics
Place of birth missing (living people)
20th-century Senegalese people